"Madayade" (stylized as MADAYADE) is Berryz Kobo's 18th single. It was released on November 5, 2008 and debuted at number 6 in the weekly Oricon singles chart.

Charts

References 

2008 singles
J-pop songs
2008 songs
Songs written by Tsunku
Song recordings produced by Tsunku
Piccolo Town singles